Zarrin Gol or Zarin Gol or Zaringul or Zarringul may refer to:
 Zarrin Gol, Golestan
 Zarrin Gol, Zanjan
 Zarrin Gol Rural District, in Golestan Province